Hugh Fortescue (2 June 1665 – December 1719) of Filleigh and Weare Giffard Hall in Devon and of Ebrington Manor in Gloucestershire, was a British landowner and Whig politician who sat in the English and British House of Commons between 1689 and 1713.

Origins
Fortescue was the eldest son and heir of Arthur Fortescue (1622–1693) of Penwarne, Mevagissey, Cornwall and of Filleigh in Devon, and his wife Barbara Elford, a daughter of John Elford of Sheepstor in Devon.

Career
Fortescue was returned as Member of Parliament for Tregony at the 1689 English general election. At the 1695 English general election he was returned as MP for Grampound. He was returned as MP for Truro at the 1698 English general election.  He was returned again as MP for Tregony at the two general election of 1701. At the 1705 English general election he was returned as MP Mitchell and was returned there again at the 1708 British general election. He was returned as MP for Lostwithiel at the 1710 British general election. He was not prominent in the House of Commons being jailed for absence on two occasions and as well as a number of non-attendances.

Marriages and children
Fortescue married twice:

Firstly on 19 October 1692 to Bridget Boscawen (d. 1708), a daughter and eventual heiress of Hugh Boscawen, (1625–1701) by his wife Margaret Clinton, a daughter of Theophilus Clinton, 4th Earl of Lincoln, and one of the co-heiresses of the Barony of Clinton upon the death of Edward Clinton, 5th Earl of Lincoln in 1692. Bridget was the only child (out of eight sons and two daughters) to outlive her father Hugh Boscawen, (1625–1701); she brought money with her marriage thus increasing Fortescue's fortune. By Bridget Boscawen he had four children as follows:
Hugh Fortescue, 1st Earl Clinton (1696–1751), summoned to Parliament in 1721 as Baron Clinton, and in 1746 created Baron Fortescue of Castle Hill (with special remainder) and Earl of Clinton (with normal remainder). He rebuilt his ancestral manor house at Filliegh as a magnificent Palladian mansion which he called Castle Hill. He died leaving no sons when the earldom became extinct, but in accordance with the special remainder the Barony of Fortescue devolved on his younger half-brother Matthew Fortescue, 2nd Baron Fortescue (1719–1785).
Boscawen Fortescue, died unmarried;
Theophilus Fortescue, died unmarried;
Margaret Fortescue (d. 14 March 1760), died unmarried. 

Secondly, after 1708, he married Lucy Aylmer, a daughter of Matthew Aylmer, 1st Baron Aylmer (circa 1650–1720). A stone relief-sculpted heraldic cartouche erected by him survives above the entrance door of his seat of Ebrington Manor House in Gloucestershire, displaying the arms of Fortescue impaling Aylmer. By Lucy Aylmer he had two further children:
Matthew Fortescue, 2nd Baron Fortescue (1719–1785), who in 1751 inherited the Barony of Fortescue by the special remainder following the death without male children of his elder half brother Hugh Fortescue, 1st Earl Clinton (1696–1751). His eldest son was Hugh Fortescue, 1st Earl Fortescue (1753–1841), of Castle Hill. 
Lucy Fortescue (died 1747), married George Lyttelton, 1st Baron Lyttelton (1709–1773)

Gallery

References

1665 births
1719 deaths
British MPs 1707–1708
British MPs 1708–1710
British MPs 1710–1713
Members of the Parliament of England for Tregony
Members of the Parliament of England for Grampound
Members of the Parliament of England for Mitchell
Members of the Parliament of Great Britain for Mitchell
Members of the Parliament of Great Britain for Lostwithiel
English MPs 1689–1690
English MPs 1690–1695
English MPs 1695–1698
English MPs 1698–1700
English MPs 1701
English MPs 1701–1702
English MPs 1702–1705
English MPs 1705–1707
Hugh